Aumühle is a station on the Berlin-Hamburg railway line, just outside the Free and Hanseatic City of Hamburg. Aumühle is served by the rapid transit trains of Hamburg S-Bahn line S21, for which it is also the eastern terminus station. The station was opened in 1884 and is located in Aumühle, a municipality in the German state of Schleswig-Holstein.

History 

Aumühle station was opened in 1884 with two side platforms and a pedestrian bridge. In 1910 the station was expanded to four tracks and complemented with today's listed station building. In 1969 Aumühle station was electrified and integrated into the Hamburg S-Bahn network.

Station layout 
The station's layout is using a natural depression to sit below street level. Above the rail tracks, Bahnhofstraße is crossing via a road bridge. At the bridge's midpoint lies the station building, with access to the platform below also possible via an elevator.

Service

Trains 

The Hamburg S-Bahn line S21 calls at Aumühle station.

Route information

See also 

 Hamburger Verkehrsverbund (HVV)
 List of Hamburg S-Bahn stations

References

External links 

 Line and route network plans at hvv.de 

Hamburg S-Bahn stations in Schleswig-Holstein
Buildings and structures in Herzogtum Lauenburg
Railway stations in Germany opened in 1884